A dasa sil mata (Sinhala: දස සිල් මාතා ) is an Eight- or Ten Precepts-holding anagārikā (lay renunciant) in Buddhism in Sri Lanka, where the newly reestablished bhikkhuni (nun's) lineage is not officially recognized yet.

The status of dasa sil matas is in between an ordinary upāsikā (laywoman) and a fully ordained bhikkhuni. They are usually expected to work in viharas, essentially as maids to ordained bhikkhus, rather than receiving training and the opportunity to practice. However, some dasa sil matas have struggled and managed to establish monasteries of their own, where women have the opportunity devote themselves to spiritual training and practice.

In Cambodia, Sri Lanka and Myanmar, they have established monasteries for anagārikās. Similar orders exist in Thailand, Cambodia and in Myanmar.

In Thailand, where it is illegal for a woman to take a bhikkhuni ordination, they are called maechi. In Cambodia, they are called donchees. In Burma, an eight precept nun is addressed as thilashin or sayalay, whereas a fully ordained woman is called a rahan-ma ("female monk"). Sri Lanka's dasa sil matas are recognized by their shaven heads and yellow robes.

See also
 Anagārika
 Donchee
 Maechi
 Siladhara Order
 Thilashin
 Upāsaka and Upāsikā

References

Buddhist titles
Buddhist religious occupations
Buddhist monasticism
Buddhism in Sri Lanka
Ordination of women in Buddhism